Limnochromini is a tribe of African cichlids from Lake Tanganyika. They are bi-parental and mouthbrooding fish.

Genera 
There are six genera within the tribe Limnochromini:

 Baileychromis Poll, 1986
 Gnathochromis Poll, 1981
 Limnochromis Regan, 1920
 Reganochromis Whitley, 1929
 Tangachromis Poll 1981
 Triglachromis Poll & Thys van den Audenaerde, 1974

References

External links 
 https://www.uniprot.org/taxonomy/319059
 

 
Pseudocrenilabrinae
Fish tribes
Cichlid fish of Africa